James Riley (October 27, 1777 – March 13, 1840) was the captain of the United States merchant ship .

Early life
James Riley was born in Middletown, Connecticut on October 27, 1777. At age 15, he began serving as a cabin boy on a trading vessel in the West Indies. By age 20 he had become a ship captain.

He married Phebe Miller in January 1802, and they had five children.

Sufferings in Africa

Riley led his crew through the Sahara Desert, after they were shipwrecked off the coast of contemporary Western Sahara in August 1815, and wrote a memoir about their ordeal. This true story describes how they came to be shipwrecked and their travails in the Sahara. The book, published in 1817 and originally titled Authentic Narrative of the Loss of the American Brig 'Commerce' by the 'Late Master and Supercargo' James Riley, is modernly republished as Sufferings in Africa.

Lost in this unknown world, Captain Riley felt responsible for his crew and their safety. He told of the events leading to their capture by marauding Sahrawi natives who kept them as slaves. Horribly mistreated, they were beaten, sun-burnt, starved, and forced to drink their own and camel urine.  A slave would be worked until close to death and then either traded or killed.

Aftermath
Once back on American shore, Riley devoted himself to anti-slavery work but eventually returned to a life at sea.  He died March 13, 1840, on his vessel the Brig William Tell between New York and St. Thomas, "of disease caused by unparalleled suffering more than twenty years previous during his shipwreck and captivity on the desert of Sahara." The lives of his crew were foreshortened, no doubt, from complications caused by their hardships in the African desert. The last surviving crewman was the cabin boy, who lived to be 82.

In 1851, eleven years after Riley's death at sea, the publishing firm of G. Brewster issued the book Sequel to Riley's Narrative: Being a Sketch of Interesting Incidents in the Life, Voyages and Travels of Capt. James Riley, from the Period of His Return to His Native Land, After His Shipwreck, Captivity and Sufferings Among the Arabs of the Desert, as Related in His Narrative, Until His Death.

Influence
Riley founded the midwestern village of Willshire, Ohio, which he named for William Willshire, the man who redeemed him from slavery.

Abraham Lincoln, who later became president of the United States, listed Sufferings in Africa as one of the three most influential works that shaped his political ideology, particularly his views on slavery. The others were the Bible and The Pilgrim's Progress (1678).

See also
 Captivity narrative
 History of Western Sahara
 Slave narrative
 White slavery
 Robert Adams (sailor)

Footnotes

References
 1816 -  Carte d'une partie de l'Afrique dessinée d'après les dernières découvertes pour servir à l'intelligence de la relation du capitaine James Riley, New York : John H. Eddy, cartographe; Collin, graveur [Bibliothèque nationale de France / Gallica].

Further reading

External links

1777 births
1840 deaths
Maritime history of the United States
African slave trade
Sea captains
19th-century American memoirists
Writers of captivity narratives
Shipwreck survivors
People from Van Wert County, Ohio
Slavery in Africa